Nation of Language are an American indie pop band that formed in Brooklyn, New York in 2016. The group consists of Ian Richard Devaney (lead vocals, guitar, synthesizer,  percussion), Aidan Noell (synthesizer, backing vocals), and Alex MacKay (bass guitar).  Michael Sue-Poi was the bassist prior to the band's 2022 tour.

History
Devaney and Sue-Poi were both members of the Static Jacks, but the band became inactive after the release of their second album. Devaney was inspired to start a new project after hearing "Electricity" by Orchestral Manoeuvres in the Dark in his father's car, a track he listened to in his childhood. What started out as Devaney "fooling around" on a keyboard later evolved into Nation of Language, with the addition of Devaney's partner Noell and former Static Jacks bandmate Sue-Poi.

The band released a number of singles from 2016 through to 2019, before releasing their debut album Introduction, Presence in May 2020.

Since 2018, Devaney has also been the lead vocalist for Machinegum, a side project created by the Strokes' drummer, Fabrizio Moretti. Moretti provided the drumming on the Nation of Language tracks "Indignities" and "Sacred Tongue". Former Static Jacks member Nick Brennan also drums on the track "Automobile".

A Way Forward, their second full-length album, was released on November 5, 2021.

On March 8, 2023, the band released the single "Sole Obsession", taken from their upcoming third album.

Discography

Albums
 Introduction, Presence (2020)
 A Way Forward (2021)
 Untitled third album (2023)

Non-album releases
 "What Does the Normal Man Feel?" (2016)
 "I've Thought About Chicago" (2017)
 "Reality" (2018)
 "One More Try" (7"-exclusive track) (2020)
 "A Different Kind of Life" (2020)
 "Deliver Me from Wondering Why" (2021)
 "Again & Again (Eleanor)" (7"-exclusive track) (2022)
 "From The Hill"/"Ground Control" (7"-exclusive track) (2022)

Covers
 "Gouge Away" (Pixies cover) (2020)
 "Stars and Sons" (Broken Social Scene cover) (2022)
 "Androgynous" (The Replacements cover) (2022)

References

Musical groups established in 2016
Indie pop groups from New York (state)
2016 establishments in New York City
American musical trios